A legume is a plant in the family Fabaceae (or Leguminosae), or the fruit or seed of such a plant. When used as a dry grain, the seed is also called a pulse. Legumes are grown agriculturally, primarily for human consumption, for livestock forage and silage, and as soil-enhancing green manure.  Well-known legumes include beans, soybeans, chickpeas, peanuts, lentils, lupins, mesquite, carob, tamarind, alfalfa, and clover. Legumes produce a botanically unique type of fruit – a simple dry fruit that develops from a simple carpel and usually dehisces (opens along a seam) on two sides.

Legumes are notable in that most of them have symbiotic nitrogen-fixing bacteria in structures called root nodules. For that reason, they play a key role in crop rotation.

Terminology

The term pulse, as used by the United Nations' Food and Agriculture Organization (FAO), is reserved for legume crops harvested solely for the dry seed. This excludes green beans and green peas, which are considered vegetable crops. Also excluded are seeds that are mainly grown for oil extraction (oilseeds like soybeans and peanuts), and seeds which are used exclusively for sowing forage (clovers, alfalfa). However, in common usage, these distinctions are not always clearly made, and many of the varieties used for dried pulses are also used for green vegetables, with their beans in pods while young.

Some Fabaceae, such as Scotch broom and other Genisteae, are leguminous but are usually not called legumes by farmers, who tend to restrict that term to food crops.

History 
Neanderthals used pulses when cooking meals 70,000 years ago.
Archaeologists have discovered traces of pulse production around Ravi River (Punjab), the seat of the Indus Valley civilisation, dating to c. 3300 BCE. Meanwhile, evidence of lentil cultivation has also been found in Egyptian pyramids and cuneiform recipes. Dry pea seeds have been discovered in a Swiss village that are believed to date back to the Stone Age. Archaeological evidence suggests that these peas must have been grown in the eastern Mediterranean and Mesopotamian regions at least 5,000 years ago and in Britain as early as the 11th century. The soybean was first domesticated around 5,000 years ago in China from a descendant of the wild vine Glycine soja.

In the United States, the domesticated soybean was introduced in 1770 by Benjamin Franklin after he sent seeds to Philadelphia from France. Henry Ford, a vegetarian, was the first person to use soybeans for large-scale industrial purposes. Concentrating on his company, from 1932 to 1933 he invested over 1 million dollars in research on soybeans. Prior to World War II, 40% of cooking oil was imported into the US. When the war came, supply routes were disrupted, which encouraged the soybean culture in the US. Due to the years of research done by Henry Ford, the domestic soybean oil industry was born. Between 1970 and 1976, soybean production increased approximately 30%. Oil yield from bulk soybeans averages about 18%. Its modern-day usage ranges from margarine, salad oils, shortening and the previously mentioned cooking oil.

Uses

Farmed legumes can belong to many agricultural classes, including forage, grain, blooms, pharmaceutical/industrial, fallow/green manure, and timber species. Most commercially farmed species fill two or more roles simultaneously, depending upon their degree of maturity when harvested.

Human consumption

Grain legumes are cultivated for their seeds, which are used for human and animal consumption or for the production of oils for industrial uses. Grain legumes include beans, lentils, lupins, peas, and peanuts.

Legumes are used as a key ingredient in vegan meat and dairy substitutes. They are growing in use as a plant-based protein source in the world marketplace. Products containing legumes grew by 39% in Europe between 2013 and 2017.

Nutritional value
Legumes are a significant source of protein, dietary fiber, carbohydrates and dietary minerals; for example, a 100 gram serving of cooked chickpeas contains 18 percent of the Daily Value (DV) for protein, 30 percent DV for dietary fiber, 43 percent DV for folate and 52 percent DV for manganese.

Legumes are also an excellent source of resistant starch which is broken down by bacteria in the large intestine to produce short-chain fatty acids (such as butyrate) used by intestinal cells for food energy.

Forage

Forage legumes are of two broad types. Some, like alfalfa, clover, vetch (Vicia), stylo (Stylosanthes), or Arachis, are sown in pasture and grazed by livestock. Other forage legumes such as Leucaena or Albizia are woody shrub or tree species that are either broken down by livestock or regularly cut by humans to provide livestock feed. Legume-based feeds improve animal performance compared to a diet of perennial grasses. Factors to which this is attributed are larger consumption, faster digestion and higher feed conversion rate.

The type of crop(s) grown or animal rearing will be dependent on the farming system, either vegetables, tubers, grains, cattle etc. In cattle rearing, legume trees such as Gliricidia sepium can be planted along edges of field to provide shade for cattle, the leaves and bark are often eaten by cattle. Green manure can also be grown between periods when crops of economic importance are harvested prior to the next crops to be planted.

Other uses

Legume species grown for their flowers include lupins, which are farmed commercially for their blooms as well as being popular in gardens worldwide. Industrially farmed legumes include Indigofera and Acacia species, which are cultivated for dye and natural gum production, respectively. Fallow or green manure legume species are cultivated to be tilled back into the soil in order to exploit the high levels of captured atmospheric nitrogen found in the roots of most legumes. Numerous legumes farmed for this purpose include Leucaena, Cyamopsis, and Sesbania species. Various legume species are farmed for timber production worldwide, including numerous Acacia species and Castanospermum australe.

Some legume trees, like the honey locust (Gleditsia) can be used in agroforestry. Others, including the black locust (Robinia pseudoacacia), Kentucky coffeetree (Gymnocladus dioicus), Laburnum, and the woody climbing vine Wisteria, have poisonous elements.

Classification

FAO recognizes 11 primary pulses. The FAO notes that the term "pulses" is limited to legumes harvested solely for dry grain, thereby excluding legumes that are harvested green for food (green peas, green beans, etc.) which are classified as vegetable crops. Also excluded are those legumes used mainly for oil extraction (e.g., soybeans and groundnuts) or used exclusively for sowing purposes (e.g., seeds of clover and alfalfa).

 Dry beans (FAOSTAT code 0176, Phaseolus spp. including several species now in Vigna)
 Kidney bean, navy bean, pinto bean, black turtle bean, haricot bean (Phaseolus vulgaris)
 Lima bean, butter bean (Phaseolus lunatus)
 Adzuki bean, azuki bean (Vigna angularis)
 Mung bean, golden gram, green gram (Vigna radiata)
 Black gram, urad (Vigna mungo)
 Scarlet runner bean (Phaseolus coccineus)
 Ricebean (Vigna umbellata)
 Moth bean (Vigna aconitifolia)
 Tepary bean (Phaseolus acutifolius)
 Dry broad beans (code 0181, Vicia faba)
 Horse bean (Vicia faba equina)
 Broad bean (Vicia faba)
 Field bean (Vicia faba)
 Dry peas (code 0187, Pisum spp.)
 Garden pea (Pisum sativum var. sativum)
 Protein pea (Pisum sativum var. arvense)
 Chickpea, garbanzo, Bengal gram (code 0191, Cicer arietinum)
 Dry cowpea, black-eyed pea, blackeye bean  (code 0195, Vigna unguiculata)
 Pigeon pea, Arhar/Toor, cajan pea, Congo bean, gandules (code 0197, Cajanus cajan)
 Lentil (code 0201, Lens culinaris)
 Bambara groundnut, earth pea (code 0203, Vigna subterranea)
 Vetch, common vetch (code 0205, Vicia sativa)
 Lupins (code 0210, Lupinus spp.)
 Pulses NES (code 0211), Minor pulses, including:
 Lablab, hyacinth bean (Lablab purpureus)
 Jack bean (Canavalia ensiformis), sword bean (Canavalia gladiata)
 Winged bean (Psophocarpus tetragonolobus)
 Velvet bean, cowitch (Mucuna pruriens var. utilis)
 Yam bean (Pachyrhizus erosus)

Pollination 
Legumes can either be self-pollinated or cross-pollinated.

Some tropical legumes that are closely self-pollinated are: Macroptilium atropurpureum 'Siratro', Macroptilium lathyroides, Centrosema pubescens, Neonotonia wightii, and Lotononis bainesii. However, the autogamous annual Stylosanthes humilis proved otherwise by adapting in response to changing conditions during an experiment, and was found to be composed of several genotypes showing heterogeneity.

Two legumes used for pasture with cross-pollination are Desmodium intortum and Desmodium uncinatum. When the flower is opened, this is the only time fertilization will take place. These two species' characteristics vary in morphology and ruggedness.

Nitrogen fixation

Many legumes contain symbiotic bacteria called Rhizobia within root nodules of their root systems (plants belonging to the genus Styphnolobium are one exception to this rule). These bacteria have the special ability of fixing nitrogen from atmospheric, molecular nitrogen (N2) into ammonia (NH3). The chemical reaction is:

Ammonia is then converted to another form, ammonium, usable by (some) plants by the following reaction:

This arrangement means that the root nodules are sources of nitrogen for legumes, making them relatively rich in plant proteins. All proteins contain nitrogenous amino acids. Nitrogen is therefore a necessary ingredient in the production of proteins. Hence, legumes are among the best sources of plant protein.

When a legume plant dies in the field, for example following the harvest, all of its remaining nitrogen, incorporated into amino acids inside the remaining plant parts, is released back into the soil. In the soil, the amino acids are converted to nitrate, making the nitrogen available to other plants, thereby serving as fertilizer for future crops.

In many traditional and organic farming practices, crop rotation involving legumes is common. By alternating between legumes and non-legumes, sometimes planting non-legumes two times in a row and then a legume, the field usually receives a sufficient amount of nitrogenous compounds to produce a good result, even when the crop is non-leguminous. Legumes are sometimes referred to as "green manure".

Sri Lanka developed the farming practice known as coconut-soybean intercropping. Grain legumes are grown in coconut (Cocos nuficera) groves in two ways: intercropping or as a cash crop. These are grown mainly for their protein, vegetable oil and ability to uphold soil fertility. However, continuous cropping after 3–4 years decrease grain yields significantly.

Distribution and production
Legumes are widely distributed as the third-largest land plant family in terms of number of species, behind only the Orchidaceae and Asteraceae, with about 751 genera and some 19,000 known species, constituting about seven percent of flowering plant species.

Storage 
Seed viability decreases with longer storage time. Studies done on vetch, broad beans, and peas show that they last about 5 years in storage. Environmental factors that are important in influencing germination are relative humidity and temperature. Two rules apply to moisture content between 5 and 14 percent: the life of the seed will last longer if the storage temperature is reduced by 5 degree Celsius. Secondly, the storage moisture content will decrease if temperature is reduced by 1 degree Celsius.

Pests and diseases 
A common pest of grain legumes that is noticed in the tropical and subtropical Asia, Africa, Australia and Oceania are minuscule flies that belong to the family Agromyzidae, dubbed "bean flies". They are considered to be the most destructive. The host range of these flies is very wide amongst cultivated legumes. Infestation of plants starts from germination through to harvest, and they can destroy an entire crop in early stage. Black bean aphids are a serious pest to broad beans and other beans. Common hosts for this pest are fathen, thistle and dock. Pea weevil and bean weevil damage leaf margins leaving characteristics semi-circular notches. Stem nematodes are very widespread but will be found more frequently in areas where host plants are grown.

Common legume diseases include anthracnose, caused by Colletotrichum trifolii; common leaf spot caused by Pseudomonas syringae pv. syringae; crown wart caused by Physoderma alfalfae; downy mildew caused by Peronospora trifoliorum; fusarium root rot caused by Fusarium spp.; rust caused by Uromyces striatus; sclerotina crown and stem rot caused by Sclerotinia trifoliorum; Southern blight caused by Sclerotium rolfsii; pythium (browning) root rot caused by Pythium  spp.; fusarium wilt caused by Fusarium oxysporum; root knot caused by Meloidogyne hapla. These are all classified as biotic problems.

Abiotic problems include nutrient deficiencies, (nitrogen, phosphorus, potassium, copper, magnesium, manganese, boron, zinc), pollutants (air, water, soil, pesticide injury, fertilizer burn), toxic concentration of minerals, and unfavorable growth conditions.

International Year of Pulses 

The International Year of Pulses 2016 (IYP 2016) was declared by the Sixty-eighth session of the United Nations General Assembly. The Food and Agriculture Organization of the United Nations was nominated to facilitate the implementation of IYP 2016 in collaboration with governments, relevant organizations, non-governmental organizations and other relevant stakeholders. Its aim was to heighten public awareness of the nutritional benefits of pulses as part of sustainable food production aimed towards food security and nutrition. IYP 2016 created an opportunity to encourage connections throughout the food chain that would better use pulse-based proteins, further global production of pulses, better use crop rotations and address challenges in the global trade of pulses.

See also 
 Beans
 Legume lectin
 List of dried foods
 List of legume dishes
 Peanut allergy

References

Further reading

External links 
 
 

 
Fruit morphology
Staple foods
Vegetables
Vegetarian cuisine